The Bok Prize is awarded annually by the Astronomical Society of Australia and the Australian Academy of Science to recognise outstanding research in astronomy by honoring a student at an Australian university. The prize consists of the Bok Medal together with an award of $1000 and ASA membership for the following year.

History
The prize is named to commemorate the energetic work of Bart Bok in promoting the undergraduate and graduate study of astronomy in Australia, during his term  (1957–1966) as Director of the Mount Stromlo Observatory.

Past winners
Source: Astronomical Society of Australia

See also

 List of astronomy awards
 Prizes named after people

References

Australian science and technology awards
Astronomy prizes
Awards established in 1989